Epropetes ozodiformis is a species of beetle in the family Cerambycidae. It was described by Martins and Napp in 1984.

References

Tillomorphini
Beetles described in 1984